Ralph was a monthly Australian men's magazine that was published by ACP Magazines, a division of PBL Media between August 1997 and July 2010. The format and style of Ralph was similar to other men's magazines, such as Maxim and Loaded.

Content
Similar to its rivals FHM and Zoo Weekly, Ralph published photos of scantily-clad models and female celebrities, without revealing their genitals or nipples. This allowed for the magazine to be sold in the lifestyle sections of newsagencies, and in other retailers such as department stores and supermarkets.

The magazine featured a number of recurring characters, such as Ralph Man, Frank Muddler and Gourmet Gav. Gourmet Gav, who would take on outrageous eating challenges, would earn celebrity beyond the pages of the magazine thanks to the development of Ralph TV.

ACP Magazines described the magazine as:
"Whether it is adventure, sport, fashion, travel, music, boys' toys, beautiful women, or life's essential how-tos, Ralph provides an environment that is purely Australian."
Ralph featured photo shoots of Australian celebrities as well as international stars. The magazine was often cross-promoted on other ACP and PBL properties, such as promotional parties held in conjunction with Cosmopolitan, and as a sponsor of home viewer competitions during the Fox Network's rugby league coverage.

It contained the same kinds of articles published in similar titles, and ran its own poll to find "Australia's sexiest woman". The results were published in an attachment to the regular magazine each year. Unlike FHM, it featured 200 women instead of FHM's 100, but Ralph's polling only took in Australia and New Zealand (where a separate edition was produced), whereas FHM's poll is worldwide.

Circulation
Ralph was reported to have had a circulation of 63,155 at the end of 2009, with a readership of 267,000. Its popularity put it ahead of other ACP titles such as FHM (with 50,000 copies and 90,000 readers), but behind the market leader among men's magazines, Zoo Weekly.

On 4 June 2010, the magazine's publishing company ACP announced that Ralph would produce its final print edition at the end of the month, with the July cover date being the final monthly magazine, although the popular Girls of Ralph special issues would continue. ACP said that the Ralph website would remain, hosted on the ninemsn network and via its mobile platform. However the Ralph website now redirects to the Zoo Weekly website.

Ralph TV
Ralph TV was a weekly television series based on Ralph magazine which aired on the Nine Network. It was hosted by Craig "Lowie" Lowe and featured a trio known as "the girls of Ralph TV", newcomers Brooke Sheehan, Candice Manning and Angela Tsun. The show aired footage of the various features and pictorials from the former monthly Ralph magazine. The premiere episode aired on 7 June 2007 and each episode was repeated on Fox8. The series was produced by Endemol Southern Star.

Final Issue of Ralph Magazine
The final issue of the magazine starred Clare Werbeloff in lingerie, who became known as the Kings Cross Bogan following her eyewitness account of a shooting outside a Kings Cross nightclub, which turned out to be a hoax. Her politically incorrect report to a television news cameraman spread online via YouTube and made her an internet celebrity.

See also
 Lad culture
 Mark Dapin

References

External links
Ralph - Official web page
Ralph TV
Ralph TV - Video
- Ralph editorial on its philosophy

1997 establishments in Australia
2010 disestablishments in Australia
ACP magazine titles
Defunct magazines published in Australia
Magazines established in 1997
Magazines disestablished in 2010
Magazines published in Sydney
Men's magazines published in Australia
Monthly magazines published in Australia